1994–95 Croatian First A League was the fourth season of First A League. It was the fourth season of Croatian handball to be played after their departure from the Yugoslav First League.

First phase

League 12

Second phase

Championship play-offs

Relegation play-offs 
{| class="wikitable"
!Club1
!Club2
!Score
|-
|Osijek 93 ||Solin Transportcommerce ||35:22*, 24:24
|-
|Zamet Rijeka ||Moslavina Kutina ||22:21*, 17:25, 23:22
|-
!colspan="3"|
|-
|colspan="3"|<small> * home match for Club1''' </small>
|}

Final standings

Sources
 Fredi Kramer, Dražen Pinević: Hrvatski rukomet = Croatian handball, Zagreb, 2009.; page 178
 Petar Orgulić: 50 godina rukometa u Rijeci, Rijeka, 2004.; pages 238 and 239
 Kruno Sabolić: Hrvatski športski almanah 1992/1993'', Zagreb, 1992.
 Jurica Gizdić: "RK Solin - 50 godina rukometa u Solinu", Solin, 2006., pages: 93, 94, 95

References

External links
Croatian Handball Federation
Croatian Handball Portal

1994-95
handball
handball
1994–95 domestic handball leagues